Thomas L. Carter is a former military and commercial pilot and retired Major General in the Air Force Reserve Command who recently served as the US Representative to the Council of the International Civil Aviation Organization. He served over 34 years with the U.S. Air Force and AF Reserve, retiring in 2009. Carter was also a US Airways pilot for 13 years. He previously served as Vice President for Government Relations at Elbit Systems of America and President of Commonwealth Consulting Corporation. He was Senior Counselor to the Coalition Provisional Authority for Legislative Affairs in Baghdad from late 2003 to 2004 and also served as Assistant to the Chairman for Government Affairs of the Columbia Accident Investigation Board in 2003. Carter is a former Deputy Assistant Secretary of Defense and a National Security Affairs staffer for Senate Republican Leader Bob Dole.

References

External links
 Biography at United States Air Force

Living people
University of Memphis alumni
Georgetown University alumni
Reagan administration personnel
Trump administration personnel
United States Air Force generals
Aviators from South Carolina
Year of birth missing (living people)
Permanent Representatives of the United States to the International Civil Aviation Organization